Asutifi North District is one of the six districts in Ahafo Region, Ghana. The District was formerly part of the then-larger Asutifi District since 1988, until the southern part of the district was split off to create Asutifi South District on 28 June 2012.
The remaining norther part is  Asutifi North District. The district assembly is located in the eastern part of Ahafo Region and has Kenyasi as its capital town.

References 

Districts of Ahafo Region